is a Japanese anime series based on the long-running manga series, Bio Booster Armor Guyver, written by Yoshiki Takaya, adapting chapters 1-60 (volumes 1–10) of the manga. The production was done in association with ADV Films and Kadokawa Shoten. It is a remake of The Guyver: Bio-Booster Armor, a 12-part OVA that aired in Japan from 1989 until its abrupt discontinuation in 1992, having only adapted volumes 1–4. The remake is a closer adaptation of the manga and aired from August 6, 2005, to February 18, 2006.

The series aired in North America on December 20, 2010, on the FUNimation Channel.

Plot
The Chronos Corporation has secret plans for the world and have biologically engineered employees and soldiers who are able to transform themselves into powerful monsters at will, beings called Zoanoids. A test type Zoanoid, disguised as a normal man, escapes after stealing a bag containing three items Chronos was studying, known as the Guyver units. Chronos soldiers attempt to recover the units from the test-type but he activates a grenade, killing himself and scattering the Guyver units. One of the lost units is discovered by two high school students, Shō Fukamachi and Tetsurō Segawa. Shō accidentally activates the unit and it merges him with biological-armor that increases all his physical abilities and arms him with deadly weaponry. He is now a Guyver, later specifically designated "Guyver I."

Determined to recruit Shō or recover the Guyver armor from his body (even if removing it proves fatal), the Chronos Corporation begins sending Zoanoids after the teenager and his friend Tetsurō. Also at risk is Tetsurō's sister Mizuki, whom Shō loves. The Zoanoid attacks lead to escalating battles that result in Shō learning to be a deadlier warrior while uncovering more of his armor's abilities. Thanks to their influence in politics and new media, the general public is kept unaware of the secret war between the Chronos Corporation and Guyver I. Eventually, Shō meets other Guyver-users and uncovers the secrets behind the origins of the Guyver units, the Zoanoids and the Chronos Corporation.

Characters
Most, if not all, of the characters from the original Guyver manga series appear in the new Guyver anime series. Several characters in the new anime series have undergone a slight change of design from their previous looks from the past animated OVA (The Guyver: Bio-Booster Armor) and manga series. For instance, Shō has a different style, brown hair rather than his original black hair. Mizuki now has black hair in the 2005 series instead of her brown hair from the previous series.

Main characters

The series protagonist. Age 17. Sho was a second-year student at a Tokyo-area high school when he and his best friend, Tetsuro Segawa, stumbled upon one of the missing G-units. Sho inadvertently activates the unit and merges with the bio-boosted armor. Labeled "Guyver I" by the Cronos Corporation, Sho must fend off the advancing swarms of Zoanoids dispatched by the corporation trying to recover the G-unit, while also protecting those close to him.

Sho's closest friend. A third-year student attending the same school as Sho. Tetsuro is a science fiction fan and the president of the school's Sci-Fi society club, which gives him some knowledge to make quite a few assumptions about the things involving the Guyver.

Sho's romantic interest and Tetsuro's younger sister. She is an average high school girl attending the same school as Shō and her brother. Initially infatuated with Agito Makishima, Mizuki starts to develop feelings for Shō after realizing she can't compete with Shizu's loyalty and devotion to Agito, and knowing the truth behind the Guyvers. By the later episodes of the anime, her affections have completely shifted towards him.

Agito is a third-year student at the same high school the others attend. He almost never allows sentiment to stand in his way. He does not even show much expression in his face, but acts quite friendly at school. He finds a Guyver unit and merges with it to become "Guyver III." Agito also seems to have extensive knowledge on the Guyver and its abilities and exhibits them quite well. Agito seems to have his own agenda when it comes to dealing with Chronos. He is an excellent example of an anti-hero. His loyal childhood friend is Shizu.

A high school girl that attends the same school as Shō and his friends. She is also a close friend to Shō and the Segawa siblings. She becomes of great help to them later when they are forced into hiding after the apparent deaths of Sho, Agito, and Masaki.

Guyot is tall, powerfully built man. In the beginning of the series, he acted as the commander of Chronos Japan branch after Agito Makishima's foster father, Genzo Makishima, failed to retrieve the Guyver units. He has an immensely commanding presence.

Masaki was a freelance journalist captured by Cronos and used as a guinea pig in the Zoalord development program. He is a tall, thin young man with shoulder-length hair, and normally wears sunglasses, even at night. He joins with Shō to fight Cronos, having his own revenge in mind. He does not quite trust Agito at first because of Guyver III's earlier connections with Chronos.

Other characters
Fumio Fukamachi

Shō Fukamachi's Father, aged 47.
Genzo Makishima

Agito Makishima's foster father and ex-Head of Chronos Japan, who becomes the first Enzyme.
Oswald A. Lisker

An inspector from Chronos Headquarters. He is "Guyver II."
Aptom

One of the Chronos "Lost Number Commandos" an elite group of Zoanoids that failed the Zoanoid optimization process. The Lost Numbers are used as expendable guinea pigs for Chronos genetic research. Aptom has the unique ability of mimicry, allowing him to recreate the abilities of other Zoanoids. As the series progresses, he receives an upgrade to his ability allowing him to enhance and combine zoanoids into more powerful hybrid creatures. The penalty (or perhaps benefit) of this process is that it renders him immune to the mental domination of the Chronos leaders.
Toshiaki Hayami/Bio-Freezer

Hamilcar Barcas

Archanfel

Sin Rubeo Amniculus

Fried'rich von Purg'stall

Luggnagg de Krumeggnic

Jabir Ibn Hayyan, Gregole

Gaster

Lǐ Yǎn-Tuí, Derzerb, Enzyme II

Zerbebuth

Elegan

ZX-Tole

Test Type

Kawada

Kobashi

Misuzawa

Dyme

One of the Chronos "Lost Number Commandos" an elite group of Zoanoids that failed the Zoanoid optimization process. Dyme has the unique ability to bond with the surrounding elements, allowing him to control the battlefield during an encounter.

Episodes

Staff

Japanese Staff
Director: Katsuhito Akiyama
Series Composition: Junki Takegami
Scenario:
Junki Takegami
Koji Ueda
Natsuko Takahashi
Yasuko Kobayashi
Yuuji Hosono
Music: Hayato Matsuo
Original Manga: Yoshiki Takaya
Character Design: Yoshihiko Umakoshi
Chief Animation Director:
Masato Sawada
Yuji Ikeda
Creature Design: Masato Sawada
General Supervision: Yoshiki Takaya
Sound director: Jun Watanabe
Animation Production: Oriental Light and Magic
Broadcaster: WOWOW
Production:
ADV Films
GENCO
Kadokawa Pictures
Sojitz Corporation
WOWOW

English Staff
ADR Director: Charles Campbell
Translation: Brendan Frayne
ADR Script: Clint Bickham
DVD Graphics: Larry Koteff
Editing:
Eddie Shannon Jr.
Neil O'Sullivan
Patrick Givens
Roberto Garcia
Executive producer:
Joey Goubeaud
John Ledford
Mark Williams
International Coordination: Toru Iwakami
Mix: Matt Wittmeyer
Packaging Design: Larry Koteff
Post-Production Manager: Shelly Thomas
Producer: Scott McClennen
Production Assistant:
Maki Nagano
Monica Jimenez
Paul Mericle
Production manager: Joey Goubeaud
Recording engineer:
Adam Jones
Afshar Kharat
Bobby Gordon
Senior Translator: Javier Lopez
Sound Design: Matt Wittmeyer
Translation Proofer: Kaoru Bertrand
ADR Recording: ADV Studios
Distributor: Madman Entertainment Pty. Ltd. (Australia & New Zealand)
DVD Production: ADV Studios
Licensed by: Funimation Entertainment

Theme songs
 Opening THEME - "Waiting for" - Reiri (Líng-Lì Yáng)
 Ending THEME - "Cotton Candy" - Bonnie Pink

Differences from the past series
The Guyver TV series covers more of the original manga storyline than the 12-episode OVA series, being more loyal to the manga, mainly the first 10 or so volumes (covering everything up to the arrival of Guyver Gigantic). However, there are key differences between the anime adaptation and The original manga series:

 In the manga, Guyver II/Oswald A. Lisker's Control Medal malfunctions during his first and only battle with Guyver I. This gives the hero a chance to kill Lisker by damaging the Control Metal further, causing his armor to consume him. In the anime, Guyver I takes the opportunity to escape when Lisker's Control Medal malfunctions, leaving the man alive for a later confrontation. As he is the only Guyver-user in Chronos' possession, Lisker is kept from fighting up until the final episode of the "Cronos Japan Arc." In the end, Lisker suffers the same grotesque death and then is trapped inside Cronos Japan's HQ when it's destroyed.
 In the manga, Guyver II uses the weapons known as the "Head Beam" and "High-Frequency Vibration Sword." In the anime, he also uses the "Mega Smasher" weapon. It's not clear if the Head Beam was used in the OVA.
 In the manga and OVA, Aptom holds Mizuki hostage and cuts off her clothing completely, leaving her naked in front of Shō. In the anime series, Aptom only cut parts of Mizuki's clothing off.
 In the manga, Guyver I/Shō loses one of his arms during his battle with Enzyme, and the limb later regenerates into a mindless clone. In the anime, the dissolving Guyver I in the Enzyme battle turns into the clone's final form.

Many of these changes were made with the permission and involvement of Yoshiki Takaya.

Subsequent releases
 The Guyver TV series made its North American TV premiere on October 26, 2006, on the Anime Network, airing only the first episode and later, the rest of the series. The first episode was also viewable for free at IGN Entertainment, Inc. for a short period of time.
 The first four episodes were released in North America on November 14, 2006, on DVD.
 Currently all 26 episodes of the television series are available through the Xbox live marketplace, via the Xbox 360.
 It also aired in the UK during the now non-existent Anime Network block on Propeller TV (Sky Digital Channel: 195) from June to November 2007.
 In spite of the fact that ADV helped produce Guyver: The Bioboosted Armor for $746,665. This was one of over thirty titles that Funimation picked up licenses from Sojitz. According to a representative of Lace, however, ADV Films still had the German and British rights to the anime. However, Manga Entertainment has re-licensed the series in the UK and the series is currently unlicensed in Germany following ADV's closure.

References

External links
 
 

Adventure anime and manga
ADV Films
Anime series based on manga
Biopunk anime and manga
Funimation
Guyver (franchise)
OLM, Inc.
Wowow original programming

fr:Guyver
it:Guyver (manga)
ja:強殖装甲ガイバー
pt:Guyver
zh:強殖裝甲